"I Want to Be with You Always" was the country music song released by Lefty Frizzell in March 1951. The song was Frizzell's third number one US Country hit since "If You've Got the Money (I've Got the Time)" one year earlier.

Recording and composition
The song was written by Lefty Frizzell and his producer, Jim Beck. The two had also penned the "If You've Got the Money I've Got the Time". The song was recorded on January 11, and released on March 19, 1951.

Personnel
 Lefty Frizzell
 Jimmy Rollins
 Joe Knight
 C.B. White
 Bill Callahan
 Eddie Caldwell
 Chubby Crank
 Madge Sutee

Success
The song was Lefty Frizzell's first number one on the Country & Western Best Seller charts where it spent six weeks at number one and a total of twenty-seven weeks on the chart.

References

1951 songs
Lefty Frizzell songs
Songs written by Lefty Frizzell
Song recordings produced by Don Law